Haikou is a town in Fuqing, Fuzhou, Fujian Province, China. The town is located in the eastern portion of the city of Fuqing, covering , and has a hukou population of 78,882 as of 2018.

Administrative divisions
The town has jurisdiction over 1 residential community and 19 administrative villages.

The town's sole residential community is Haikou Community, which serves as its administrative center.

The town's administrative villages are Yunguang, Niuzhai, Qian, Chengli, Douyuan, Haikou Village, Houlu, Chenguang, Lixin, Dongjiao, Dongqi, Wuyu, Licuo, Nancuo, Dongge, Cendou, Yangban, Shixi, and Gongnong.

Demographics 
Haikou was home to 75,166 residents as of 2012.

See also 
 List of township-level divisions of Fujian

References 

Towns in Fujian
Fuqing